Lazar Arsenijević Batalaka (Bukovik, Kragujevac, 1793 - Belgrade, 15 January 1869) was a Serbian participant in the First Serbian Uprising and later a state adviser (since 1842),  diplomatic representative of Serbian to Constantinople (from 1846 to 1847), Minister of Justice and Minister of Education and a historian.

Biography
He received his education during the First Serbian Uprising at the newly-established grandes écoles founded by Ivan Jugović (Jovan Savić). His professor was also Lazar Vojnović (1783-1812), who gave a posthumous speech.

After the fall of the Serbian uprising in 1813, he first fled to Austria, where he stayed briefly in Novi Sad and then left for Imperial Russia, where he spent more than ten years in Hotin and Chisinau. He was in exile in connection with prominent insurgent leaders (Karadjordje, Luka Lazarević, Vule Ilić, Janićije Đurić, Sava Filipović, and others) and supported himself by teaching the children of wealthier Serb refugees. In 1814 Batalaka moved to Hotin, where he was employed as a secretary corresponding with the Serbian commanders from all regions of the Balkans. A stay near Karađorđevo was a great moral and spiritual support for Batalaka. After Karadjordje's death in 1817, Batalaka wrote in two letters to Prince Miloš Obrenović that he was willing to return to Serbia. In 1827, Batalaka's petitions fetched fruit. He returned to Serbia that year (1827) and entered the civil service. He first served in various jurisdictions, in Požarevac, Kladovo, Kragujevac (where Dimitrije Davidović nicknamed him "Batalaka"), Belgrade and Smederevo. After the dynastic upheaval in Serbia in 1842, he made rapid progress in the civil service. He became State Counselor in 1842, then a chief ministerial envoy (kapućehaja) in Constantinople (1846-1847), Minister of Education and Justice (1848) and again Minister of Education (1852-1854). The repeated dynastic upheaval in Serbia (1858) this time with a negative impact on his political career. After a brief detention, he retired with other state advisers at the Belgrade Military Hospital in 1858. Afterward, he devoted himself to writing memoirs (1858-1864) and partly to cooperating with Ilija Garašanin on national policy.

It took Batalaka considerable time to finish his "History of the Serbian Uprising", working on it over many years. Batalaka took into consideration all documentation, original material concerning the Uprising; its official documents, interviews with leaders, participants and correspondence with contemporaries, narrative materials of various origins; then the excerpts from published works and other early records of the Serbian uprising were collected with the utmost care and referenced.

His book "History of the Serbian Uprising" (Istorija srpskog ustanka), not only by its scope but by the content and abundance of documentation, is one of the most complete, first-hand works of the revolution that lasted from 1803 until 1813, which ultimately led to the restoration of the Serbian state in the very early 19th century. In 1803 Karadjordje's set the stage for the emancipation of Serbia after 350 years under the Ottoman yoke, beginning with the fall of Smederevo Fortress in 1453.

Batalaka's history was invaluably helpful to Ilija Garašanin when it came to dealing with request of Russian consuls in Serbia.

See also
 List of Serbian Revolutionaries

References 

1793 births
1869 deaths
Diplomats from Kragujevac
Politicians from Belgrade
People of the First Serbian Uprising
People from the Principality of Serbia
Justice ministers
19th-century Serbian historians
Education ministers of Serbia
Justice ministers of Serbia